The Critics' Choice Movie Award for Best Animated Feature is an award given to people working in the motion picture industry by the Broadcast Film Critics Association. The award was introduced in 1998. Toy Story is the only franchise with multiple wins, winning three times for Toy Story 2 (1999), Toy Story 3 (2010) and Toy Story 4 (2019). Since 2001, almost all of the films went on to win the Academy Award for Best Animated Feature, with the exception of Cars, Wreck-It Ralph, The Lego Movie, and The Mitchells vs. the Machines.

In 2020, the category and animated films were honored at the Critics' Choice Super Awards instead of the main Critics' Choice Awards. The category returned to the main show in 2021.

Winners and nominees

1990s

2000s

2010s

2020s

See also
Academy Award for Best Animated Feature
Annie Award for Best Animated Feature
BAFTA Award for Best Animated Film
Golden Globe Award for Best Animated Feature Film

References

F
Lists of films by award
Awards for best animated feature film

Awards established in 1998
Awards disestablished in 2019
Awards established in 2021